Urussu (Urıssu) is an urban locality (an urban-type settlement) and the administrative center of Yutazinsky District in the Republic of Tatarstan, Russia, located on the left bank of the Ik River at the border with the Republic of Bashkortostan,  from the republic's capital of Kazan. As of the 2010 Census, its population was 10,681.

History
It was established in 1945–1946 and was granted urban-type settlement status in 1947. It served as a district administrative center in 1958–1963 and then again since 1991.

Administrative and municipal status
Within the framework of administrative divisions, the urban-type settlement of Urussu serves as the administrative center of Yutazinsky District, of which it is a part. As a municipal division, Urussu is incorporated within Yutazinsky Municipal District as Urussu Urban Settlement.

Economy
As of 1997, local industrial facilities included a thermal power station and various construction, chemical, and electrical plants.

Urussu is a railway station on the Ulyanovsk–Ufa line.

Demographics

As of 1989, the population was mostly Tatar (52.6%), Russian (39.4%), Bashkir (1.8%), and Ukrainian (1.6%).

References

Notes

Sources

Уруссу

Urban-type settlements in the Republic of Tatarstan
Populated places established in the 1940s